Michel-Louis Guérard des Lauriers (25 October 1898 – 27 February 1988) was a French Dominican theologian and, later in life, a traditionalist Catholic bishop who supported sedevacantism and sedeprivationism and was excommunicated by the Holy See.

Biography
Michel-Louis Guérard des Lauriers was born near Paris, France, on 25 October 1898.

In 1921, he entered the Scuola Normale Superiore. He studies for two years in Rome, with Professor Tullio Levi-Civita.

In 1925, he entered the Order of Preachers. He entered the Dominican novitiate of Amiens in 1927. He made his profession in 1930.

He was a normalien and agrégé in mathematics.

Priesthood
On 29 July 1931, des Lauriers was ordained a priest.

In 1933, he became a professor of philosophy at the Dominican school of theology Le Saulchoir, in Belgium. In 1940, he received a doctorate in mathematics with thesis Sur les systèmes différentiels du second ordre qui admettent un groupe continu fini de transformations.

Under Pope Pius XII, he served as a professor at the Pontifical Lateran University in Rome.

With the advent of the Second Vatican Council in the 1960s, des Lauriers became concerned with events taking place in the Catholic Church. He was the main intellectual force behind the famous critical study of the Mass of Paul VI (Novus Ordo Mass) called the Ottaviani Intervention, presented to Paul VI in October 1969.

In 1979, worried about Archbishop Marcel Lefebvre and a possible deal with the Vatican among other things, des Lauriers wrote to Lefebvre warning him.

Sedeprivationism
Des Lauriers supported the belief that the current state of the papacy, based on Paul VI allegedly teaching heresy in the context of the Magisterium, was that Paul VI could not be a true pope, being only pope materially (papa materialiter) and not formally. This position known as the Thesis of Cassiciacum.

Episcopacy

Des Lauriers further believed that the new rites of ordination and episcopal consecration (newest Pontificale Romanum, new forms by promulgation of 18 June 1968) promulgated by Paul VI were doubtfully valid (or even outright invalid) and therefore it was necessary to take action to secure a valid apostolic succession for the preservation of the (Latin Rite) Roman Catholic Church. Doctor Eberhard Heller and Doctor Kurt Hiller, German sedevacantists who were harboring Ngô Đình Thục (1897–1984), former archbishop of Huế, Vietnam, began discussions with des Lauriers, and after it was falsely reported that des Lauriers agreed to abate his sedeprivationism and adhere to the theoretical tenets of absolute/totalist sedevacantism, it was agreed that the archbishop would consecrate him a bishop.

On 7 May 1981, after long consideration, des Lauriers was consecrated a bishop by Thuc in Toulon, France. He was thus excommunicated from the Catholic Church in March 1983 by Cardinal Joseph Ratzinger.

Des Lauriers consecrated two bishops: Günther Storck, a German, on 30 April 1984; Robert McKenna, an American, on 22 August 1986.

Death and legacy

Des Lauriers died in Cosne-sur-Loire, France, on 27 February 1988, at the age of 89. He is buried in Raveau, France.

There are some bishops who adhere to his Thesis of Cassiciacum: Bishop  (a Belgian) of the Istituto Mater Boni Consilii (IMBC), and Bishop Donald Sanborn of the Roman Catholic Institute (RCI), which is based in the United States.

Writings

By des Lauriers
Le Saint-Esprit, âme de l'Eglise, Étiolles, Seine et Oise : Monastère de la Croix, 1948.
Garabandal,  S.l., 1965.
Lettera ad un religioso di Simone Weil ; trad. di Mariella Bettarini. Risposta alla Lettera ad un religioso di Guérard des Lauriers ; trad. di Carmen Montesano (Lettre à un religieux),  Torino : Borla, 1970.
La Mathématique, les mathématiques, la mathématique moderne, Paris : Doin, 1972.
Homélie (prononcée le 15 mai 1971 pour l'anniversaire de la mort de l'amiral de Penfentenyo de Kervéréguin),  Versailles : R.O.C., 1973. 
La Charité de la vérité, Villegenon :  Sainte Jeanne d'Arc, 1985.
La Présence réelle du Verbe incarné dans les espèces consacrées, Villegenon : Sainte Jeanne d'Arc, 1987.

On des Lauriers's doctrine
Louis-Marie de Blignières, Le mystère de l'être. L'approche thomiste de Guérard des Lauriers, Paris, J. Vrin, 2008.

References

Further reading
Interview with Bp. Guerard des Lauriers about the Cassiciacum Thesis (Italian)

École Normale Supérieure alumni
1898 births
1988 deaths
French traditionalist Catholics
Sedeprivationists
20th-century French Catholic theologians
People excommunicated by the Catholic Church
Thục line bishops
French Dominicans
Dominican bishops